Kamaleddin Kamyabinia (born 18 January 1989) is an Iranian professional footballer who plays as a defensive midfielder for Persian Gulf Pro League club Persepolis.

Club career

Mes Kerman 
When he was playing for Mes Kerman, he was used as a striker.

Rah Ahan 
Kamyabinia joined Rah Ahan in 2009 after spending the previous two seasons at Mes Kerman.

Shahrdari Tabriz 
On 2 July 2011, Kamyabinia joined the Shahrdari Tabriz.

Naft Tehran

Kamal joined Naft Tehran in 2013. During his two years at the club he helped them to back third-place in the league which qualified them for the AFC Champions League for the first time and also finished runners-up of the 2014–15 Hazfi Cup.

Persepolis

On 26 June 2015 Kamyabinia joined Persian Gulf Pro League club Persepolis on a two–year contract. He scored his first goal for the club on 2 February 2016 in a 2–2 draw against Sepahan. On 9 April 2016 Kamyabinia scored the winning goal in the 94th minute for Persepolis in a 2–1 victory against Malavan.

Kamyabinia scored Persepolis' first goal of the 2016–17 season on 26 July 2016 in a 1–0 win against Saipa. He has also scored important goals for Persepolis in the ACL.

Kamyabinia suffered a shoulder injury in the match against Navad Urmia in Iran’s Hazfi Cup and was rushed to the hospital. He was on target for Persepolis twice in 2018–19.

On 24 August 2021, He extended his contract with Persepolis for three years. He has been one of the key players of Persepolis in these years and has played a significant role in the midfield of the team.

In 2021, Varzesh 3 wrote about his popularity among teammates. He also received the humorous nickname "Uncle" from teammates and fans.

Club career statistics

International career

Senior Team

He made his debut on 12 November 2015 against Turkmenistan in a 2018 World Cup qualifier. Kamyabinia scored his first international goal in a 6–0 victory against Guam.

International goals
Scores and results list Iran's goal tally first.

Style of play 

His playing style is destructive and he has a high passing ability. With his history of playing in the positions of defense and midfielder, he has been considered to have "adequate and sufficient destructive power".

Personal life 
He is married to Khadija Asgari, an Iranian athlete, and has a daughter named Kamand. He also sometimes took his daughter to the training of the Persepolis football team.

Honours
Persepolis
Persian Gulf Pro League (5): 2016–17, 2017–18, 2018–19, 2019–20, 2020–21
Hazfi Cup (1): 2018–19
Iranian Super Cup (4): 2017, 2018, 2019, 2020 ; Runner-up (1): 2021
AFC Champions League Runner-up (2): 2018, 2020

References

External links

Kamal Kamyabinia at eurosport
Kamal Kamyabinia at Fmdataba

Kamal Kamyabinia at PersianLeague.com

1989 births
Living people
Rah Ahan players
Sanat Mes Kerman F.C. players
Shahrdari Tabriz players
Naft Tehran F.C. players
Persepolis F.C. players
Iran under-20 international footballers
Iranian footballers
Footballers at the 2010 Asian Games
Sportspeople from Tehran
Association football midfielders
Asian Games competitors for Iran
Persian Gulf Pro League players